"Louisiana Woman, Mississippi Man" is a song written by Becki Bluefield and Jim Owen, and recorded as a duet by American country music artists Conway Twitty and Loretta Lynn. It was released in May 1973 as the first single and title track from the album of the same name. The song was their third number one on the country chart as duo. The single would stay at number one for one week and spend a total of 13 weeks on the country chart.

Critical reception
Billboard magazine reviewed the song favorably, saying that the song has an "up-tempo Cajun sound" and that the pair "comes off beautifully." It goes on to say that the song is a "change of pace and, naturally, well produced."

Synopsis
The song details the travails of a couple geographically separated by the Mississippi River. They emphatically pledge that their love is too great to let the wide distance of the river keep them separated. The man pledges to somehow cross the river while the woman claims she will go so far as to swim the distance (one mile, the song claims).

Appearances in other media
The song appears in the Grand Theft Auto: San Andreas video game soundtrack, on the fictitious radio station K-Rose.

Chart performance

References

1973 songs
1973 singles
Conway Twitty songs
Loretta Lynn songs
Song recordings produced by Owen Bradley
Male–female vocal duets
MCA Records singles
Songs about Mississippi
Songs about Louisiana